The Little Hocking River is a small tributary of the Ohio River,  long, in southeastern Ohio in the United States. The river flows for its entire length in southwestern Washington County; its tributaries also drain a small area of southeastern Athens County.

The Little Hocking River begins in Fairfield Township between the communities of Barlow and Bartlett and initially flows southeastward through southwestern Barlow Township into Dunham Township, where it is dammed to form Veto Lake, which is surrounded by the  Veto Lake State Wildlife Area. Downstream of Veto Lake, the river flows southwestward into Belpre Township; near its mouth it turns eastward and flows into the Ohio River at the community of Little Hocking.

Among the Little Hocking River's tributaries are three with names derived from that of the main stream:

According to the Geographic Names Information System, the Little Hocking River has also been known historically as "Little Hockhocken River," "Little Hockhockin River," and "Little Hockhocking River."

See also
List of rivers of Ohio
Root Covered Bridge

References

Rivers of Ohio
Tributaries of the Ohio River
Rivers of Washington County, Ohio